The Dolphins are a professional rugby league football team based in the Redcliffe Peninsula area of the Moreton Bay Region, Queensland,  that competes in the Australian National Rugby League (NRL). Launched as a bid for inclusion into the NRL by Queensland Cup side Redcliffe Dolphins in 2020, the Dolphins were granted a separate licence in October 2021 to compete as the national league's 17th side from the 2023 season onwards. It is the fourth NRL team in the state of Queensland, and the second in the capital city of Brisbane, alongside the Brisbane Broncos. The Dolphins are the first team to join the NRL competition since the Gold Coast Titans joined in 2007.

History
The Dolphins have a rich history beginning in 1947 that has led to an NRL berth in 2023. In 1947 The Redcliffe Peninsula Rugby League Club club is founded, in an effort to promote the game of rugby league in the Peninsula area. A meeting of interested parties on February 27 in that year made the formation of the club a reality and the first office bearers were elected.

The first club unofficial club emblem – or at least nickname – was the ‘Shellgrit’, no doubt spawned by the abundance of shell grit on the peninsula’s beaches.

The original colours were gold and then blue, before maroon and white was set upon in 1952. This would morph into the traditional dark red and white that was the genesis of the Dolphins’ NRL colours of red, white and gold and played in the Brisbane Rugby League Premiership and Queensland Cup until admission to the National Rugby League in 2023. 

In 2020, coinciding with the opening of a new Moreton Daily Stadium, (known as Kayo Stadium from 7 December 2022), the Redcliffe Dolphins launched a bid on 22 September 2020 for the inclusion of a separate new team in the national competition. On 13 October 2021, the 17th NRL licence was granted to the Dolphins  after they competed for it against two other consortiums (the Brisbane Firehawks and Brisbane Jets) also linked to existing Queensland Cup clubs. Wayne Bennett was signed as the inaugural NRL coach. On 26 November 2021, the Dolphins made their first major signing for their 2023 entry, recruiting Felise Kaufusi from the Melbourne Storm. Not long after, he was joined by Storm team mates, Jesse Bromwich (who was named as the Dolphins inaugural team captain in February 2023) and his brother Kenny Bromwich. Although separately licensed, the Dolphins NRL venture is owned by the Redcliffe Dolphins and is their fully professional spin-off club.

In December 2021, it was confirmed that QRL team the Central Queensland Capras had secured a full affiliation deal with the Dolphins. The Capras and Dolphins deal should see up to six Dolphins NRL players compete for the Capras in the Queensland Cup competition each week. In May 2022. the PNG Hunters announced a strategic pathways partnership with the Dolphins that includes full NRL pre-season participation for four young Papua New Guinean players, beginning in the PNGNRL Digicel Cup, through to the PNG Hunters in the Queensland Rugby League state competition and then directly into the Australian NRL system.

On 7 November 2022, inaugural pre-season training for 2023 began. Pre-season trial matches were played against the Central Queensland Capras at Marley Brown Oval in Gladstone on 4 February 2023  (the Dolphins won 24-8), against the North Queensland Cowboys at Barlow Park in Cairns on 12 February  (the Dolphins drew 22-22), and the Gold Coast Titans on 19 February at Kayo Stadium (the Titans won 40-16).

On 10 November 2022, the NRL officially released the 2023 fixtures. This included the Dolphins' first NRL match, against the Sydney Roosters on Sunday 5 March 2023 at Suncorp Stadium, Brisbane to honour rugby league Immortal Arthur (Artie) Beetson, a former player and coach of both the Redcliffe Dolphins and the Roosters. The Dolphins won 28-18 in front of a crowd of 32 177 fans. Jesse Bromwich captained the side. Hamiso Tabuai-Fidow scored the Dolphins' first points with a try. Subsequent points were added by Mark Nicholls (one try), Connelly Lemuelu (one try) and Jamayne Isaako (two tries and four conversion goals). The Artie Legacy Medal for player of the match was awarded to Felise Kaufusi.

Name and colours

The Dolphins retained the red and white of their Queensland Cup counterparts, with gold added to the colour scheme to avoid a clash with NRL club St. George Illawarra Dragons. Otherwise, the 'Redcliffe' name is not being used in an effort to broaden appeal nationally beyond the local region.

After a fan vote in July 2022, "Phinny" the Dolphin was confirmed as the club's NRL mascot. Sandy, a companion mascot, was later revealed. During a pre-season training camp, senior players composed a team theme song. Separately, the team catchphrase and hashtag is 'Phins Up' (#PhinsUp).

Jerseys
On 27 October 2021, the Dolphins unveiled a heritage jersey design, inspired by the Redcliffe Dolphins jersey from the 1980s. The design is predominantly red, with white sleeves and a gold trim. On 2 October 2022, the debut home jersey design for 2023 was unveiled just prior to kick-off of the 2022 NRL Grand Final at Accor Stadium in Sydney. The inaugural away jersey was released on 11 November. Otherwise, the team training shirt is predominantly black in colour.

Kit sponsors and manufacturers

Players

2023 Signings
Pre-season training commenced 7 November 2022, with 7 December designated as the inaugural open training session for fans and the general public to attend. In their first NRL match, the Dolphins defeated the Sydney Roosters 28-18 on Sunday 5 March 2023 at Suncorp Stadium in Brisbane.

Home grounds
The Dolphins play most of their twelve home games at the 52,500-capacity Suncorp Stadium in Brisbane, with a few other matches at Sunshine Coast Stadium and Kayo Stadium,  which also serves as a training and administration base. The redevelopment of Browne Park in Rockhampton may also see occasional Dolphins' games at that venue.

Affiliations and junior clubs
Queensland Cup affiliates
Redcliffe Dolphins
Central Queensland Capras
PNG Hunters

BRL affiliates
Brighton Roosters
Pine Rivers Bears

Regional affiliates
Wide Bay & Bundaberg Region

Mal Meninga Cup (U18), Cyril Connell Cup (U16) and Harvey Norman (U19 girls) affiliates
Redcliffe Dolphins
Central Queensland Capras
Wide Bay Bulls

Local junior clubs
A list of Junior Rugby League clubs within the Dolphins area. In brackets, JRL teams fielded in 2022.

Albany Creek Crushers (20)
Brighton Roosters (23)
Burpengary Jets (33)
Dayboro Cowboys (13)
Moreton Bay Raiders (14)
Narangba Rangers (23)
North Lakes Kangaroos (21)
Pine Central Holy Spirit Hornets (37)
Pine Rivers Bears (19)
Redcliffe Dolphins (45)
Samford Stags (15)
Valleys Diehards (21)
Beachmere Pelicans (3 - U13 & above)
Bribie Island Warrigals (8 - U13 & above)
Caboolture Snakes (13 - U13 & above)

Further notes

References

External links

Official sites
 Dolphins official webpage
 Dolphins player profiles

Supporter sites
 Dolphins Pod – Dolphins fan discussion forum

 
2023 establishments in Australia
Rugby clubs established in 2023
Expansion of the National Rugby League
National Rugby League clubs
Redcliffe Dolphins
Rugby league teams in Brisbane
Proposed sports teams
Proposals in Australia